Denise Trudel (born 27 August 1955) is a Canadian politician. She was a Coalition Avenir Québec member of the National Assembly of Quebec for the riding of Charlesbourg from 2012 to 2014, first elected in the 2012 election.

Prior to her election to the legislature, Trudel served on Quebec City Council from 2005 to 2012.

Personal

Trudel is the daughter of former Quebec City Councillor Gilles Trudel.

References

External links
 

Living people
1955 births
Coalition Avenir Québec MNAs
Women MNAs in Quebec
Quebec City councillors
People from Alma, Quebec
Women municipal councillors in Canada
21st-century Canadian politicians
21st-century Canadian women politicians